Cini Boeri (19 June 1924 – 9 September 2020) was an Italian architect and designer.

Career 

Boeri earned her degree at the Politecnico di Milano university in 1951. At that time, there were more female interior designers than architects because it was thought that women were too fragile to work outside.  After collaborating with Marco Zanuso from 1951 through 1963, she started an independent architectural practice. Her main focuses in architecture were civil and interior architecture, as well as industrial design.

In the 1970s, Boeri began designing showrooms for Knoll in Europe and America. She also designed a variety of sofas and chairs for the company, some of which are still in production today. In addition, she worked for a variety of other design companies, including lighting company Artemide, furniture company Arflex, and the housewares company Rosenthal. Some do not know that Boeri was a trained architect because of her work for Knoll and Arflex.

Different examples of her work can be found in museumsand international exhibitions.

Prizes and awards 
Boeri was awarded many prizes; among those, in 1979 a Compasso D'Oro (strips product design for arflex) and a Lifetime Achievement Award from the Italian Cultural Institute of Los Angeles in 2008.

Death 
She died on 9 September 2020 in Milan, Italy at the age of 96.

Works 
Source:

Design 

 	1964	Borgogna armchair (Arflex)
 	1967	Bobo and Cubotto one-piece armchair (Arflex)
 	1967	ABS luggage set (Franzi)
 	1968	Bengodi sofa (Arflex)
 	1970	Lunario table and Gradual sofa (Knoll)
 	1971	Serpentone sofa (Arflex)
 	1972	Strips sofa (Arflex)
 	1972	Cibi glasses and crystal decorative objects (Arnolfo di Cambio)
 	1973	Lucetta desk lamp (Stilnovo)
 	1976	Talete table (Arflex)
 	1977 	Brigadier armchair (Knoll)
 	1980	Double face revolving bookcase (Arflex)
 	1982	Tre B handles (Fusital)
 	1982	Dito desk table (Tronconi)
 	1982	Rever door (Tre-P Tre-Più)
 	1983	Malibu table (Arflex)
 	1983	prefabricated house (Misawa Homes, Tokyo)
 	1987	Ghost armchair (Fiam)
 	1989	Steps drawer (Estel)
 	1989	Feltro chandelier (Venini)
 	2007	To the wall bookcase (Magis)

Architecture

 	1966-67	Holiday house in Punta Cannone (La Maddalena, Italy)
 	1967		Holiday house on Abbataggia gulf (La Maddalena, Italy)
 	1970		Museum house of Antonio Gramsci in Ghilarza (Oristano Italy)
 	1976		Restoration of Palazzo Forti (Verona, Italy)
 	1990		Country house (Piacenza, Italy)
 	1997		EDS office building (Rome, Italy)
 	2003/2004	Holiday house on Abbataggia gulf (La Maddalena, Italy)
 	2007		Museum of the Duomo treasure (Monza, Italy)

Publications 
Cecilia Avogadro (a cura di), Cini Boeri, architetto e designer, Silvana Editoriale, 2004
 Charlotte Fiell; Peter Fiell (ed): Design des 20. Jahrhunderts, Taschen, Cologne 2012,, p. 121

References

Italian designers
Polytechnic University of Milan alumni
1924 births
2020 deaths
Architects from Milan
Italian women architects
Compasso d'Oro Award recipients